The Uprising in Serbia was initiated in July 1941 by the Communist Party of Yugoslavia against the German occupation forces and their Serbian quisling auxiliaries in the Territory of the Military Commander in Serbia. At first the  Yugoslav Partisans had mounted diversions and conducted sabotage and had attacked representatives of Aćimović's quisling administration. In late August some Chetniks joined the uprising and liberated Loznica. The uprising soon reached mass proportions. Partisans and Chetniks captured towns that weak German garrisons had abandoned. The armed uprising soon engulfed great parts of the occupied territory. The largest liberated territory in occupied Europe was created by the Partisans in western Serbia, and was known as the Republic of Užice. Rebels shared power on the liberated territory;  the center of the Partisan liberated territory was in Užice, and Chetniks had their headquarters on Ravna Gora.

As the uprising progressed, the ideological rift between the two factions became more and more obvious. On one side were the Chetnik detachments who considered themselves loyal to the royal government in exile and fought for the restoration of pre-war order. On the other side were members of the Peoples Liberation Army of Yugoslavia who favored the introduction of socialism and the post-war reorganization of Yugoslavia on a federal basis. The Chetnik leader Dragoljub Mihailović abandoned the uprising in late October and entered into negotiations with the quisling government and the Germans in order to destroy the rival Partisans.

The Germans soon gathered a large force and quelled the uprising using mass terror, but the remaining Partisan forces crossed into Bosnia, where they formed the 1st Proletarian Brigade. After the collapse of the uprising, Territory of the Military Commander was largely pacified until the return of the Partisans and the Belgrade Offensive in second half of 1944. Meanwhile, the Chetniks became even more reluctant to fight against Germans, and engaged in anti-Partisan operations and open collaboration. Nevertheless, Mihailovic was able to establish himself as the sole legitimate representative of the Yugoslav government-in-exile, who ordered that all resistance forces should fight under his command.

Background 

Hitler believed that with the occupation of Yugoslavia the country was liquidated as an independent state. The Kingdom of Yugoslavia was divided between Germany, Italy, Hungary and Bulgaria, while in the territory of present-day Croatia and Bosnia and Herzegovina, the Independent State of Croatia was proclaimed. Occupiers plundered possessions and took some 350,000 Yugoslav soldiers into captivity. The largest part of Serbia was organized into the Territory of the Military Commander in Serbia and as such it was the only example of the military regime in occupied Europe. The Germans chose Milan Aćimović as head of the quisling Commissary Government.

Preparations for the uprising

Communists 

Preparations for the uprising by the Communist Party of Yugoslavia began after the May consultation held in Zagreb on 4 May 1941. The Military Committee of the Provincial Committee of the Communist Party for Serbia was formed in mid-May. On 13 May 1941, Josip Broz Tito sent a message to the Comintern stating that the Yugoslav communists were preparing for an uprising that would commence when Germany attacked the Soviet Union. The Central Committee of the Communist Party of Yugoslavia arrived in Belgrade in late May, and this was of great importance for the development of the resistance. After their arrival, the Central Committee held conferences with local party officials.

The German invasion of the Soviet Union was launched on 22 June 1941. Before the invasion, the Germans withdrew the majority of their troops from Serbia, leaving three weak divisions in Serbia (the 704th, 714th and 717th Infantry Divisions) and one weak division (the 718th Infantry Division) in the Independent State of Croatia. The majority of these divisions were made up by older soldiers originating from Austria. Communist sympathisers in Srđan Budisavljević's Ministry of Interior in Dušan Simović's government, such as Janko Janković, destroyed files on communists held in prewar police archives. So, when mass arrests of communists began after the launching of Operation Barbarosa, few records were available for the Gestapo to use. The communists then considered that all the requirements for the uprising were now met.

The entrance of the USSR into the war strengthened the hope of the Serbian people (who traditionally saw Russia as protector of Serbia), as well as optimism that the war would be over soon. Dragomir Jovanović recorded that on 22 June atmosphere in the streets was similar to atmosphere of during coup on 27 March. In Mačva peasants pulled out stakes from  haystacks fearing that Soviet paratroopers would impale by falling. In Belgrade, the observers were placed on a tall building to report the arrival of Soviet aircraft. In Banat, medical groups were formed to help paratroopers.

Decision for preparing struggle in Serbia issued on June 23, 1941 at the meeting of the Provincial Committee for Serbia, which was attended by Aleksandar Ranković, Spasenija Babović, Đuro Strugar, Moma Marković, Ivo Lola Ribar, Blagoje Nešković, Vukica Mitrović, Mirko Tomić, Miloš Matijević, Ljubinka Milosavljević, Vasilije Buha and Milovan Đilas. At the meeting were determined party instructors for certain parts of Serbia. In light of upcoming struggle, communist had to hasten forming of armed groups and collecting weapons and medical supplies. After the meeting, instructors went into their designated areas. Moma Markovic by the end of June held meetings with district committees in Jagodina, Niš and Zaječar, Mirko Tomić was in charge for Kruševac, Vasilije Buha went to Niš, Milan Mijalković went in Užice and Čačak, Miodrag Ivković in Šabac. Petar Stambolić operated in Pomoravlje area and Miloš Minić in Valjevo area. Several local detachments were formed numbering dozens of partisans. Significant amounts of weapons and ammunition were collected.
Supreme Staff of People's Liberation Partisan Detachments was established on June 27. Josip Broz Tito was chosen as Supreme Commander. Remaining members were: Milovan Đilas, Edvard Kardelj, Ivan Milutinović, Aleksandar Ranković, Rade Končar, Franc Leskošek, Sreten Žujović, Ivo Lola Ribar and Svetozar Vukmanović. On July, in home of Vladislav Ribnikar on Dedinje was held session of Central Committee. Present were Tito, Ranković, Milutinović, Đilas, Ribar, Vukmanović and Žujović. Decision was made on beginning of sabotages and small attacks on German and quisling forces. Here was established Supreme Staff for Serbia with Žujović, Filip Kljajić, Branko Krsmanović, Nikola Grulović and Rodoljub Čolaković as members. This date was later celebrated in socialist Yugoslavia as Fighter's Day.

On July 5, a communist party proclamation appeared that called upon the Serbian people to struggle against the invaders. The Serbian people were reminded of their glorious past, and called upon to side with "invincible Slavic Russia" headed by Stalin, the greatest son of Russian people. Communists pointed time had come for armed struggle against invaders, urged people to organize partisan detachments, set fire in factories ad warehouses, destroy rails and communications, organise hiding of wheat, etc.

Chetniks 

Yugoslav Army colonel Dragoljub Mihailović avoided falling into German hands during the invasion. He and his followers hid on the plateau of Ravna Gora on the Suvobor mountain, arriving on 13 May. It was an isolated area, with weak German presence and influence, and local administration and gendarmerie remaining intact. During the first months at Ravna Gora, Mihailović tried to come into contact with other officers who also avoided capture or formed own detachments, developed an intelligence network, come into contact with the government-in-exile and win local officials for his cause. With their help, Mihailović was creating lists of reservists and conscripts he would mobilise. The only civilians that were included into his organisation were members of the Serbian Cultural Club, such as Dragiša Vasić and Stevan Moljević.

Mihailović believed that war would not end soon. He made his first public appearance on a village fair in Tometino Polje on 28 June, where he announced to gathered people that preparations for armed combat were done, but the moment for its beginning hadn't yet come.

Resistance begins 

Western Serbia was chosen as the base of the uprising, due to forests and hilly terrain, and due to its population which had provided strong resistance to invading Austrian forces in World War I. The first Partisan and Chetnik detachments were formed in the Valjevo area.

For the beginning of the uprising is taken armed action of Rađevina partisan detachment on 7 July 1941 in Bela Crkva near Krupanj. In Bela Crkva was held the traditional Ivanjdan midsummer village fair. There came a group of fifteen partisans, led by commander Miša Pantić and political commissar Žikica Jovanović Španac. Partisans gathered people and  called them to join in fight against the German invaders. Speech was given by Pantić, a doctor from Valjevo, and Jovanović, a journalist from Valjevo and combatant from Spanish Civil War. Gendarmes  Bogdan Lončar and Milenko Braković tried to break up the gathering, forbidden under conditions of military occupation. The partisans opened fire and killed both gendarmes.

Spread of the uprising 
The uprising spread from western Serbia to other parts of Serbia. During July and August many Party and SKOJ proclamations that called on armed struggle were printed. Communist groups cut communication lines along rail line between Niš and Leskovac. Main power line of Radio Belgrade was cut already on 4 July. Saboteurs in Belgrade set fires on German trucks, garages, trains, etc.

Commissariat of Interior registered 220 sabotages during July. Attacks were carried out on police and gendarmerie stations, seats of local governments, rail lines. Village Valjevska Kamenica was liberated on 22 July. German representative Felix Bender reported to Minister for Foreign Affairs that various groups of "determined communists consists of 60–100 members, who, partially well armed... carries out terrorist acts toward Serbian people, take or kill Serbian officials, make sabotages", etc. Bender mentioned killings of German soldiers, attacks on German trains, trucks, sabotages on military installations. He also reported that the gendarmerie inflicted losses to communists, but that it suffered losses, too.

Chetniks join the uprising 

When organized partisan struggle begun, few ex-Army commanders, originally without of Mihailović's approval, carried by wave of the uprising, took part in combat. Mihailović didn't want to start his uprising, but to wait and build up his forces, waiting for a favourable moment. He thought that Germans were stronger in every way and every resistance is futile and counter-productive. Participation of Chetnik forces in the uprising was largely forced by fear that partisans will take influence within Serbian people. Former officers couldn't stand to watch how young boys and laymen from ranks of teachers, students, workers and peasants were waging battles. It was particularly true for officers who were compromised by their poor performance during Axis invasion four months ago and whom civilians considered for incompetent cowards.

In late August Mihailović ordered creation of Chetnik detachments, made of recruits 20–30 years old. Their assignment would be taking power at moment of popular uprising. Mihailović proclaimed himself legitimate representative of Yugoslav Royal Army and, on basis of Yugoslav laws, demanded enlisting of reservists 30–40 years old. This Chetnik units had assignment to prevent pillages and unnecessary violence, and in the same time, actions of destructive elements (communists).

Since the end of August first contacts of Partisans and Chetniks were made. Already on August 25, agreement on joint attacks was made by commander of Podrinje Partisan detachment and Captain Dragoslav Račić, a commander of Cer Chetnik detachment. Joint Partisan-Chetnik actions against German forces came to the fore during takings of Krupanj and Gornji Milanovac, battle of Šabac and sieges of Valjevo and Kraljevo.

Battle of Loznica 

Chetnik insurgents launch a surprise attack on the occupied town of Loznica on the morning of 31 August 1941 after which the Germans refused the invitation to surrender send out from a courier the previous night. Fighting for Loznica was the largest armed conflict with the Germans in occupied Yugoslavia until then.

Capture of Banja Koviljača 

Banja Koviljača was captured in a battle fought between 1 and 6 September 1941 between allied forces of Chetniks and Partisans on one side and German forces garrisoned in occupied Banja Koviljača (now Western Serbia) and Ustashe relief forces from Bosnia (then in NDH) on the Axis side. The battle took place during the Uprising in Serbia, soon after Chetniks captured Loznica on 31 August 1941. The attack on the German outpost in Banja Koviljača was the first major battle between Serb rebels and German forces by the end of Invasion of Yugoslavia. The action of Chetniks against occupying German forces garrisoned in Loznica and Banja Koviljača was organized in period of Partisan-Chetnik collaboration. The Battle of Banja Koviljača was the first battle where Chetniks and Partisans were allied against Axis forces.

Battle of Krupanj 
After three days of fighting, Krupanj was liberated on September 3, 1941 by Valjevo Partisan detachment and Chetniks led by Orthodox priest Vlada Zečević and lieutenant Ratko Martinović. Zečević, Martinović and bulk of their Chetniks later joined to partisans.

Liberation of Užice

Battle of Šabac 

Nebojša Jerković, a commander of Mačva Partisan detachment, visited Chetnik captain Dragoslav Račić, a commander of Cer Corp in order to reach agreement on joint attack on Šabac. Battle of Šabac lasted from September 22 until September 24, when 342nd German Division came in aid to besieged Germans and broke rebel encirclement. German soldiers retaliated and killed some 1,000 men from Šabac and Mačva. Number of soldiers in Mačva Partisan detachment drop to half on initial troops. Deployment of 342nd German Division in the Mačva operation marked beginning of big German counter-offensive on liberated territory.

Battle of Kruševac

Battle of Gornji Milanovac

Battle of Čačak

Battle of Kraljevo 

The siege of Kraljevo was the most important battle during the Uprising in Serbia in 1941. The siege lasted in period 9—31 October 1941. The battle was waged between besieging forces of the Chetniks and Yugoslav Partisans against German forces garrisoned in Kraljevo in the German-occupied territory of Serbia (modern-day Serbia).  

The rebel forces had between 3,000 and 4,000 soldiers. The battle started on 9 October 1941 when Chetniks attacked German forces near Monastery of Žiča. Several days after the battle began in a reprisal for the attack on a German garrison, the German forces committed a massacre of approximately 2,000 civilians in period between 15 and 20 October, in an event known as the Kraljevo massacre. 

On 23 October most of the Partisan forces left the siege of Kraljevo and regrouped their forces to attack Chetniks in Čačak, Užice and Požega. The rebels organized their last larger attack on Kraljevo on 31 October, using two tanks previously captured from German forces, but failed after suffering heavy casualties. 

In early November most of the Chetnik forces besieging Kraljevo retreated to reinforce their positions in other towns in Western Serbia attacked by communist forces. On 20 November 1941 both rebel formations signed truce only to be soon again defeated by German offensive in December 1941 that forced Partisans to leave Serbia and Mihailović and his Chetniks to flee constant German chases.

Republic of Užice 

The Republic of Užice was a short-lived liberated Yugoslav territory and the first liberated territory in World War II Europe, organized as a military mini-state that existed in the autumn of 1941 in occupied Yugoslavia, more specifically the western part of the Territory of the Military Commander in Serbia. The Republic was established by the Partisan resistance movement and its administrative centre was in the town of Užice.

Initial German response

Government of National Salvation 

The Government of National Salvation, also referred to as the "Nedić regime", was the second Serbian puppet government, after the Commissioner Government, established on the Territory of the (German) Military Commander in Serbia during World War II. It was appointed by the German Military Commander in Serbia and operated from 29 August 1941 to October 1944. The Nedić regime enjoyed some support. The Prime Minister throughout was General Milan Nedić. The Government of National Salvation was evacuated from Belgrade to Kitzbühel, Austria in the first week of October 1944 before the German withdrawal from Serbia was complete. Nedić himself was captured by the Americans when they occupied Austria, and was  subsequently handed over to the Yugoslav communist authorities to act as a witness against war criminals on the understanding he would be returned to American custody to face trial by the Allies. The Yugoslav authorities refused to return Nedić to American custody, and he died on 4 February 1946 after falling out the window of a Belgrade hospital, under circumstances which remain unclear.

Killings of civilians 

The Kragujevac massacre was the murder of Serbs, Jewish and Roma men and boys in Kragujevac, Serbia, by German Wehrmacht soldiers on 20 and 21 October 1941. All males from the town between the ages of sixteen and sixty were assembled by German troops and members of the collaborationist Serbian Volunteer Command (SDK) and Serbian State Guard (SDS), including high school students, and the victims were selected from amongst them. On 29 October 1941, Felix Benzler, the plenipotentiary of the German foreign ministry in Serbia, reported that 2,300 people were executed. Later investigations by the post-war Yugoslavian government came up with between 5,000 and 7,000 people executed, although these figures were never proven reliable. Subsequently, Serbian and German scholars have agreed on the figure of 2,778.

Partisan-Chetnik split 
In order to quell the uprising, Germans brought additional troops and carried out a campaign of severe reprisals against the civil population. The German actions forced Mihailović to withdraw his troops from combat, attack the Partisans and seek contact with the German administration in order to end hostilities. He met with representatives of the Wehrmacht in the village of Divci. Despite his offer, the Germans replied that they would soon bring armoured units that would end the uprising and that "the German Wehrmacht cannot burden itself with allies who join it from opportunistic reasons". Mihailović replied that he had to take some towns from Germans in order to prevent communists taking them, and that he didn't want to fight against the Germans. He tried to persuade the Germans of his unconditional loyalty and requested supplies for combat against the Partisans. He also asked the Germans that his "patriotic actions" remain secret so as to avoid for him the fate of Kosta Pećanac, who openly made agreement with the Axis, lost any influence with the Serbian people and became considered a traitor by his own people.

Despite Mihailović's offers, the Germans left him no option but unconditional surrender. From that time he waged relentless war against the Partisans. Chetnik actions against Partisans in southwest Serbia at the end of 1941 were parallel or nearly parallel with German actions against Partisans. The Partisan HG for Serbia issued a proclamation to the Serbian people on the treachery committed by Mihailović, saying he attacked the Partisans and sought to deceive honest Serbian peasants and Chetniks.

During fights between Chetniks and Partisans in western Serbia at the beginning of November 1941, Chetniks captured a few hundred partisans. Out of this number, Chetniks gathered 365 captured Partisans and on November 13, handled them to Nedić's and German troops, who either executed them or sent them to concentration camps in occupied Serbia, Germany or Norway. Concurrently with Mihailović's turn toward Germans, Yugoslav Prime Minister in exile Dušan Simović promoted him via Radio London for commander of all armed Yugoslav troops in the country.

End of the uprising

Operation Uzice 
Operation Uzice was the first major counter-insurgency operation by the German Wehrmacht on the occupied territory of the Kingdom of Yugoslavia. The operation was directed against the Užice Republic, the first of several "free territories" liberated by the Yugoslav Partisans. It was named after the town of Užice, and is associated with the First Enemy Offensive in Yugoslavian historiography. The security forces of the German-installed puppet regime of Milan Nedić also participated in the offensive.

After the offensive commenced on 20 September 1941, the Partisans initially received assistance from local Chetnik formations in opposing the Germans, but after weeks of disagreement and low-level conflict between the two insurgent factions about how the resistance should proceed, the Chetniks launched an attack on the Partisans in the towns of Užice and Požega on November 1 which resulted in the Chetniks being repulsed. The Partisans then counter-attacked decisively, but by early December had been driven from liberated area by the German and Serb collaborationist offensive.

Operation Mihailovic 
Operation Mihailovic was the final German anti-guerrilla offensive to suppress the Serbian Chetnik detachments of the Yugoslav Army, headed by Colonel Dragoljub Mihailović. The offensive took place from 4 to 9 December 1941 near Šumadija, in the Territory of the Military Commander in Serbia.

Aftermath 
The uprising in Serbia failed to cause any serious casualties to Axis forces, which suffered 200 soldiers killed and 400 wounded. About 4,000 men of the rebels were killed during the fighting, while 35,000 civilians were killed in Serbia as victims of German reprisals.

See also 

 World War II in Yugoslavia
 Republic of Užice
 Operation Užice
 Kragujevac massacre

Notes

References

Literature 

 

 

 

 

 

 

 

 

 

 

 

 

 

 

 

Serbia in World War II
1941 in Serbia
Conflicts in 1941
Battles of World War II involving Chetniks
Battles involving the Yugoslav Partisans
1941 in Yugoslavia